The 1986 Wyoming Cowboys football team represented the University of Wyoming in the 1986 NCAA Division I-A football season. A  charter member of the Western Athletic Conference (WAC), Wyoming played its home games in War Memorial Stadium, an outdoor facility on campus in Laramie, Wyoming.

The Cowboys were led by head coach Dennis Erickson, in his only season at Wyoming, and finished with a record of six wins and six losses . The Cowboys' offense scored 299 points while the defense allowed 272 points.

Schedule

Reference:

References

Wyoming
Wyoming Cowboys football seasons
Wyoming Cowboys football